Rumpin (Sundanese:ᮛᮥᮙ᮪ᮕᮤᮔ᮪) is a district in Bogor Regency, Province West Java, Indonesia. This district has a postal code of 16350.

Villages
In Rumpin district there are 13 villages namely:
 Cibodas
 Cipinang
 Gobang
 Kampung Sawah
 Kertajaya
 Leuwibatu
 Mekar Jaya
 Mekar Sari
 Rabak
 Rumpin
 Sukamulya
 Sukasari
 Taman Sari

Demographics

Ethnic groups
Rumpin is the home for of the Sundanese tribe, which is the original tribe in West Java. There is no official data on the number of ethnic groups in Rumpin, but as a whole it is dominated by Sundanese. In addition, there are a small number of people who are Betawi. There are also a small portion of Javanese and Chinese, which are widely found in the Rumpin area.

Religion 

The majority of the population of Rumpin embraces the religion Islam, a small portion of the religion Christianity and Buddhism adhered to by the minority Chinese. The original tribes in West Java namely Sundanese generally embrace the religion Islam and some embrace and the original beliefs of the Sundanese tribe, namely Sunda Wiwitan.

Language 
Sundanese which is the original and dominant tribe in West Java, affects the language of communication used in social life. Sundanese is the main language used by the people of Rumpin and West Java in general, apart from Indonesian which is the official language of Indonesia.

Borderlines
Rumpin is one of the districts in Bogor regency, this district is directly adjacent to Banten Province in the north, with Ciseeng in the east (which is connected by Gerendong Bridge), to the west by Cigudeg and Parung Panjang and the south is bordered by Leuwisadeng and Leuwiliang.

References

Districts of Bogor Regency